Deh Now-ye Gonbaki (also Romanized as Deh Now-ye Gonbakī and Deh Now-e Gonbakī; also known as Deh-e Now and Deh Now) is a village in Gonbaki Rural District, Gonbaki District, Rigan County, Kerman Province, Iran. At the 2006 census, its population was 435, in 115 families.

References 

Populated places in Rigan County